Technical variations of Solaris distributions include support for different hardware devices and systems or software package configurations. Organizational differences may be motivated by historical reasons. Other criteria include security, including how quickly security upgrades are available; ease of package management; and number of packages available.

These tables compare each noteworthy distribution's latest stable release on wide-ranging objective criteria. It does not cover each operating system's subjective merits, branches marked as unstable or beta, nor compare Solaris distributions with other operating systems.

General 

Basic general information about the distributions: creator or producer, release date and latest version, and so forth.

Technical

Package management and installation
Information on features in the distributions. Package numbers are only approximate.

Security features

See also

 Comparison of operating systems
 Comparison of open-source operating systems

References

External links

OpenSolaris
Solaris distributions